The Giant Spider Invasion is a 1975 science fiction horror film produced, composed and directed by Bill Rebane, and follows giant spiders that terrorize the town of Merrill, Wisconsin and its surrounding area. The film was theatrically released in 1975 by Group 1 Films, and enjoyed a considerable run to become one of the 50 top-grossing films of that year.

After a three-time ABC network run, The Giant Spider Invasion achieved further exposure many years later, when it was featured in a 1997 episode of Mystery Science Theater 3000. It is now regarded as a cult classic in the B movie realm.

Plot
The central plot of the film revolves around the titular spider invasion, which occurs when what appears to be a meteorite crashes down in rural Wisconsin, and spawns spiders of varying sizes.

Subplots include Dan Kester and his love/hate relationship with his wife Ev, Dan's adulterous affair with local barmaid Helga, Dave Perkins' attempts to make out with Ev's underaged sister Terry, a fundamentalist preacher leading a revival meeting, and Drs. Vance and Langer becoming romantically involved. The townspeople eventually panic when confronted with the spider.

The invasion is deduced to be the result of some sort of interdimensional gateway, and is ultimately thwarted when Drs. Vance and Langer manage to close off the gateway, draining the spiders of their energy and causing them to melt into puddles of sludge.

Cast

Production

Originally conceived as an idea from Richard Huff, he and actor Robert Easton, a friend of Rebane, were tasked to write the script. By the time filming began, creative differences led to a script not being made and only pages of dialogue had been written. To motivate Easton, who was told to write 10 to 15 pages a day, Rebane locked him in a cabin and told him to finish the daily task or he would not be fed. The cast of the film consisted of Hollywood veterans. It was tentatively titled The Great Spider Invasion.

The Giant Spider Invasion was shot in Gleason, Tomahawk and Merrill, Wisconsin in six weeks with a budget of $300,000.  The University of Wisconsin–Stevens Point was also used for filming. Former mayor of Madison, Wisconsin and future Wisconsin Circuit Court Judge William Dyke was an uncredited executive producer, helping to fund and find a distributor for the film. Special effects artist Bob Millay was hired to design the spiders for the film. Jack Willoughby was the cinematographer. Rebane's wife Barbara worked as the script girl. Tarantulas were used in portions of the film, sent from Arizona through trucking by the special effects crew.

While attempting to film a scene where the spider explodes, the effects team covered the prop with gunpowder and had a crew member attempt to ignite it with matches. Despite using the entire matchbox, the spider did not explode and Rebane decided to stop filming. Immediately after they stopped, the spider exploded, causing two crew members to get their hair singed and be taken to the hospital to be treated for severe burns.

Release

The Giant Spider Invasion was distributed by Group 1 International Distribution Organization. The movie was released in theaters in 1975. In an interview with Fangoria in 1996, Bill Rebane claimed the movie grossed $15 million. Turner Classic Movies claimed the movie made a $22 million return. In the United States and Canada, video rentals of the movie in 1976 grossed to $2,347,000. On television, it was featured on The CBS Late Movie.

The Giant Spider Invasion was released on DVD by multiple video companies, including Retromedia in 2002 and a director's cut on May 5, 2009 by MVD Visual. It was released on Blu-ray on June 15, 2015 by VCI Entertainment.

Reception
Brandlon L. Chase, the president of distributor Group 1 International Distribution Organization, won the "Outstanding Executive Achievement" award at the Academy of Science Fiction, Fantasy and Horror Films. Linda Gross for the Los Angeles Times called it a "poorly done combination of science fiction, Jaws, and Day of the Locust." Gross was also critical on the films script and Rebane's direction, but thought the spiders to be scary. Glenn Garvin from The Delta Democrat-Times described the movie as "self-subconsciously ludicrous". Garvin also recounted during his theater experience kids at the screening were laughing instead of being scared by the film. Albuquerque Journals Chuck Mittlestadt gave the film a warmer reception, giving positive marks for its editing and direction. Mittlestadt also gave praise to Barbara Hale, Kevin Brodie, and Alan Hale's acting.

Michael Weldon, in The Psychotronic Encyclopedia of Film, while criticizing the special effects and comparing them negatively to The Giant Claw, he considered the movie to be "Lots of laughs". Leonard Maltin wrote, "Veteran cast can't do much for this tacky horror opus filmed in Wisconsin." VideoHound's Golden Movie Retriever gave the film one star, while Robert Firsching from Allmovie gave the movie one star out of five, speaking negatively about Rebane's direction and the movie's use of humor. Blockbuster Entertainment gave the film one star and thought that the unintentional laughs from the film worn thin quickly.

The film is listed on 'The 100 Most Enjoyably Bad Movies Ever Made' in the book The Official Razzie Movie Guide by Golden Raspberry Award founder John Wilson. Wired listed the movie as one of the "cheesiest movies" ever made.

Legacy
On May 31, 1997, The Giant Spider Invasion was featured on the Sci-Fi Channel in a season eight episode of Mystery Science Theater 3000 (MST3K), a comedy television series in which the character Mike Nelson and his two robot friends Crow T. Robot and Tom Servo are forced to watch 'bad films' as part of an ongoing scientific experiment. Regarding the episode, Director Bill Rebane thought it was strange, but overall accepted it due to its popularity.

In 2006, Rhino Entertainment released the MST3K episode as part of the "Volume 10" DVD collection of the series, along with Godzilla vs. Megalon, Swamp Diamonds, and Teen-Age Strangler. The boxset was later recalled due to the rights to Godzilla vs. Megalon being disputed. It was redistributed in the "Volume 10.2" collection in 2008, with Godzilla vs. Megalon being replaced by The Giant Gila Monster.

Bill Rebane had a festival given in his honor; the "Bill Rebane Film Festival" took place in Madison, Wisconsin in May 2005. Hosting the festival were MST3K stars Michael J. Nelson and Kevin Murphy, the voice of Tom Servo. In an article recapping the festival in Scary Monsters Magazine, the two noted that although they lambasted the film during their show, they admired how Rebane was able to pull cast and crew together to get the film made. In 2011, it was announced that the movie was going to be remade into a musical.

In a 2012 interview with Wisconsin television station WSAW-TV, Rebane remarked that he was not sure how the movie became popular, saying it was not an initial hit until it became a cult classic. He also stated that while the movie grossed millions of dollars over the past 35 years, he never saw a fraction of the money, calling the film "one of the most pirated movies in history." Despite his grievances, Rebane was proud of the impact that the movie made for the city of Merrill, Wisconsin.

In 2012, film historian Bill Dexter found the shells of the two 30-feet spiders with the intent on restoring the spiders to their original form. In 2013, the shell of one of the main giant spiders was reported stolen by Rebane. Weeks later, a recycling facility announced that the giant spider was brought to them as scrap metal.

On August 15, 2019, The Giant Spider Invasion was featured as a Rifftrax live show.

See also
 List of American films of 1975
 Night of the Lepus (1972 horror film similar in content)
 Frogs

References

Bibliography

External links
 
 
 
 

1975 films
American monster movies
Giant monster films
Films set in Wisconsin
Films shot in Wisconsin
Films about spiders
Films directed by Bill Rebane
1970s English-language films
1970s American films